Ramsden Dock railway station (also known as Barrow Island and officially as Barrow Ramsden Dock) was the terminus of the Furness Railway's Ramsden Dock Branch in Barrow-in-Furness, England.

The station operated between 1881 and 1915. Located at the southern tip of Barrow Island alongside Ramsden Dock it primarily served the adjacent Walney Channel passenger ferry terminal. It was accessible by Ramsden Dock Road and the Barrow-in-Furness Tramway.

The station building was demolished in the 1940s, while the rail line leading to it was completely removed in the 1990s. No evidence of either remain and a windfarm operations centre has been built on the site.

References

Sources

External links
The station on an Edwardian 25" OS map, with overlays National Library of Scotland
The station and nearby lines on multiple old maps Rail Maps Online
The station and line with mileages Railway Codes

Former buildings and structures in Barrow-in-Furness
Former Furness Railway stations
Railway stations in Great Britain opened in 1881
Railway stations in Great Britain closed in 1915
Disused railway stations in Cumbria
1881 establishments in England